Turner Island may refer to:

Antarctica
 Turner Island (Antarctica)

Canada
 Turner Island (Queens), in Nova Scotia
 Turner Island (Halifax), near Halifax Nova Scotia
 Turner Island (Nipissing), in the Nipissing region of Ontario
 Turner Island (Muskoka) in the Muskoka region of Ontario
 Turner Island (Manitoba) in Manitoba
 Turner Island (Saskatchewan), in Saskatchewan
 Turner Island (British Columbia) in British Columbia

Greenland
 Turner Island (Greenland)